CBJ may refer to:

 CBJ-FM, a French-language Canadian radio station
 cbj (publisher), a German publisher
 Brazilian Judo Confederation, or Confederação Brasileira de Judô
 Central Bank of Jordan, the central bank of Jordan
 Christian Bookstore Journal, a trade magazine
 Clive Barker's Jericho, a supernatural horror-themed first person shooter video game
 Columbus Blue Jackets, a professional ice hockey team based in Columbus, Ohio
 City and Borough of Juneau (CBJ), the unified municipality of Juneau, Alaska located on the Gastineau Channel
 Cabo Rojo Airport (IATA code: CBJ), Caribbean coastal airport in the Dominican Republic
 Country Bear Jamboree, an attraction at the Magic Kingdom in the Walt Disney World Resort and at Tokyo Disneyland
 Cyclone Business Jet, an undergraduate student organization designing and constructing a prototype 10-passenger airplane
 Saab Bofors Dynamics CBJ-MS, a Swedish PDW/submachine gun